The .303  is an arguably obsolete but capable medium bore rifle cartridge.

Overview
The .303 Magnum was a bottlenecked centerfire rifle cartridge that was produced in both semi-rimmed and rimless versions. The cartridge's case capacity was the same as the .30-06 Springfield, although performance was considered to favour the .303 Magnum.

The cartridge had a brief life, only appearing in the Kynoch catalogue until 1930 and it appears to have become obsolete by 1932.

See also
 .303 British
 List of rifle cartridges
 7mm rifle cartridges

References

External links
 Cartridgecollector, ".303 Magnum Rimless", cartridgecollector.net, retrieved 16 December 2016.
 Cartridgecollector, ".303 Magnum Semi Rimmed", cartridgecollector.net, retrieved 16 December 2016.

Pistol and rifle cartridges
British firearm cartridges
W.J. Jeffery & Co cartridges
Weapons and ammunition introduced in 1919